Morellia is a very large genus from the fly family Muscidae. Morellia are plumpish black flies, largely lacking eye hairs - sparse at most. they have a white dusting on the parafacialia and the scutum has 4 distinct longitudinal stripes.

Selected species
M. aenescens Robineau-Desvoidy, 1830
M. asetosa Baranoff, 1925
M. basalis (Walker, 1853)
M. hortorum (Fallén, 1817)
M. micans (Macquart, 1855)
M. podagrica (Loew, 1857)
M. simplex (Loew, 1857)

References

Muscidae
Diptera of North America
Diptera of Europe
Brachycera genera
Taxa named by Jean-Baptiste Robineau-Desvoidy